The 2018–19 Women's EHF Cup was the 38th edition of EHF's second-tier women's handball competition.  It started on 8 September 2018.

Siófok KC defeated Team Esbjerg 47–42 in the final.

Overview

Team allocation

Round and draw dates
The schedule of the competition was as follows (all draws were held at the EHF headquarters in Vienna, Austria).

Qualification stage

Round 1
There were 28 teams participating in round 1.
The draw seeding pots were composed as follows:

The first legs were played on 8–9 and the second legs were played on 15–16 September 2018. Some teams agreed to play both matches in the same venue.

|}
Notes

1 Both legs were hosted by Metraco Zagłębie Lubin.
2 Both legs were hosted by ŽRK Metalurg.
3 Both legs were hosted by IUVENTA Michalovce.
4 Both legs were hosted by Viborg HK.
5 Both legs were hosted by Handball Käerjeng.
6 Both legs were hosted by TuS Metzingen.
7 Both legs were hosted by KHF Shqiponja.
8 Both legs were hosted by Mecalia Atlético Guardés.
9 Both legs were hosted by Fredrikstad BK.
10 Both legs were hosted by Kastamonu Belediyesi.
11 Both legs were hosted by GVM Europe-Vác.
12 Order of legs reversed after original draw.

Round 2
There were 32 teams participating in round 2. 14 teams who qualified from round 1 and 18 teams joining the draw.
The first legs was played on 13–14 October and the second legs was played on 20–21 October 2018. Some teams agreed to play both matches in the same venue.

|}
Notes

1 Both legs were hosted by CS Măgura Cisnădie.
2 Both legs were hosted by Kuban Krasnodar.

Round 3
A total of 24 teams entered the draw for the third qualification round, which will held on Tuesday, 23 October 2018.

The draw seeding pots were composed as follows:

The first legs were played on 10–11 November and the second legs were played on 17–18 November 2018.

|}

Group stage 

The draw for the group phase was held on Thursday, 22 November 2018. In each group, teams played against each other in a double round-robin format, with home and away matches.

Group A

Group B

Group C

Group D

Knockout stage

The draw event was held at the EHF Office in Vienna on Tuesday 12 February 2019. The draw determined the quarter-final and also the semi-final pairings. The country protection rule was not applied in the draw, which means the four Danish teams can face their domestic rivals in the quarter-finals. However, teams from the same group could not meet in the next stage.

Quarterfinals

Seeding

The first quarter-final leg was scheduled for 2–3 March 2019, while the second leg followed one week later.

|}

Matches

Viborg HK won 52–39 on aggregate

Herning-Ikast Håndbold won 52–50 on aggregate

Team Esbjerg won 74–55 on aggregate

Siófok KC won 63–55 on aggregate

Semifinals 

The semi-finals first legs were played on 6–7 April 2019, while the second leg was scheduled for 13–14 April 2019.

|}

Matches

Siófok KC won 53–51 on aggregate

Team Esbjerg won 53–36 on aggregate

Final 
The first leg was played on 4–5 May and the second legs was played on 11–12 May 2019. The final home rights draw was held on 16 April in Vienna.

|}

Matches

Siófok KC won 47–42 on aggregate

Top goalscorers

See also
2018–19 Women's EHF Champions League
2018-19 Women's EHF Challenge Cup

References

External links
 Official website

 
Women's EHF Cup seasons
EHF Cup Women
EHF Cup Women